(born 23 September 1986 as Toshiji Naoe) is a former professional sumo wrestler from Tokyo, Japan. His highest rank was maegashira 13. He won the jūryō championship in March 2012.

Career
He was the first professional sumo wrestler from Waseda University in 78 years. He joined Oguruma stable in January 2009, recruited by former ozeki Kotokaze. He was promoted to the juryo division in July 2011 after winning the makushita division championship or yusho with a perfect 7-0 record. At this point he changed his shikona from his family name of Naoe to Kimikaze. After winning the juryo championship in March 2012 with a 12-3 record, he was promoted to the top makuuchi division. He had to withdraw from his debut tournament in the top division on the 13th day and never managed to return to makuuchi. He is the first wrestler since Sakaizawa to have to withdraw from his only top division tournament.

Retirement from sumo
Due to persistent injuries, including a torn rotator cuff in his right shoulder, he announced his retirement in May 2014. His danpatsu-shiki or official retirement ceremony took place on June 22, 2014 at the Tokyo Metropolitan Hotel with around 230 guests taking part in the hair-cutting. His marriage was announced at the event. After leaving sumo he returned to his hometown of Chofu to open a sumo-themed restaurant.

Fighting style
Kimikaze was an oshi-sumo specialist, preferring pushing techniques to fighting on the mawashi or belt. His most common winning kimarite was oshi-dashi (push out) but he was also very reliant on slap downs (hataki-komi).

Career record

See also
List of sumo tournament second division champions
Glossary of sumo terms
List of past sumo wrestlers

References

External links

1986 births
Living people
Japanese sumo wrestlers
Sumo people from Tokyo